is a Japanese voice actress from Nagoya, Aichi Prefecture. She is represented by the agency Arts Vision. She has loved watching anime since she was a child, and realized the joy of acting in a Musical theatre she did in elementary school. She first learned about voice acting when she fell in love with Ryoma Echizen from The Prince of Tennis in junior high school. She was fascinated by the breadth of voice acting work, and after being involved in theater in high school and college, and with the encouragement of my friends around her, she decided to become a voice actor. Since there were not many training schools or vocational schools for voice actors in Nagoya, where she was born, she entered the Japan Narration Acting Institute, which had a school in Nagoya. She took lessons once a week while attending university. After working at the Japan Narration Acting Institute, she joined her current agency.

In January 2023, it was announced that Suwa had married Smile Down the Runway creator Kotoba Inoya.

Voice roles

TV anime

2012
Code:Breaker, Tsubomi
Chousoku Henkei Gyrozetter, Saki Kono/Eraser Queen
2013
Red Data Girl, Haruna Mita
Kin-iro Mosaic, Honoka Matsubara
Gingitsune, Saki Suzui
Yowamushi Pedal, Miki Kanzaki
Love Lab, Mika Kiriyama
2014
Riddle Story of Devil, Tokaku Azuma
Captain Earth, Saori Sasaki
If Her Flag Breaks, Ruri Ninjabayashi
The Fruit of Grisaia, Yūji Kazami (young)
Jinsei, Ikumi Suzuki
Trinity Seven, Hijiri Kasuga
Nobunaga the Fool, Otama
The Kawai Complex Guide to Manors and Hostel Behavior, Miharu Tsuneda
The Irregular at Magic High School, Kazumi Takigawa
Yowamushi Pedal Grande Road, Miki Kanzaki
Log Horizon 2, Kyōko
2015
Absolute Duo, Tomoe Tachibana
Assassination Classroom, Tōka Yada
Comet Lucifer, Otto Motō
Hello!! Kin-iro Mosaic, Honoka Matsubara
Lance N' Masques, Shirohime
Mikagura School Suite, Himi Yasaka
Miss Monochrome: The Animation 2, Akiko
Mobile Suit Gundam: Iron-Blooded Orphans, Mikazuki Augus (young)
Mysterious Joker, Haruka Oniyama
Pikaia!, Hana
The Asterisk War, Ayato Amagiri (young)
The Eden of Grisaia, Yūji Kazami (young)
The Labyrinth of Grisaia, Yūji Kazami (young)
Valkyrie Drive: Mermaid, Hibiki Kenjō
2016
Active Raid, Yuyuko Shimazakura, Aju Tomigusuku, Kanna Miyoshi
Assassination Classroom 2nd Season, Tōka Yada
 Keijo!!!!!!!!, Sachiko Yamikumo
 KonoSuba, Chris, Eris
Lostorage incited WIXOSS, Aya Narumi
Matoi the Sacred Slayer, Matoi Sumeragi
Nyanbo!, Sabatora
 Phantasy Star Online 2: The Animation, Rina Izumi
Please tell me! Galko-chan, Iinchō
Tanaka-kun Is Always Listless, Echizen
The Morose Mononokean, Mocha
WWW.Wagnaria!!, Yūta Shindō (young)
2017
KonoSuba 2, Chris
Urara Meirocho, Saku Iroi
Yowamushi Pedal: New Generation, Miki Kanzaki
Twin Angel Break, Vail (ep. 1, 4 - 9)
Musekinin Galaxy Tylor, Dolly
Gamers!, Rena
Konohana Kitan, Natsume
Restaurant to Another World, Arte
Children of the Whales, Urumi, Nibi (young), Cocaro
2018
Alice or Alice, Coco
My Sweet Tyrant, Non Katagiri
2019
Boogiepop and Others, Naoko Kamikishiro
Fairy Gone, Clara Kisenaria
Isekai Quartet, Chris
Re:Stage! Dream Days♪, Ruka Ichijō
The Demon Girl Next Door, Sion Ogura
2021
Gekidol, Izumi Hinazaki
SSSS.Dynazenon, Mujina
Duel Masters King!, Himiko
Let's Make a Mug Too, Yukari Ōsawa
Seirei Gensouki: Spirit Chronicles, Rio (young)
Bakugan: Geogan Rising, Jenny Hackett
2022
Girls' Frontline, Negev
The Demon Girl Next Door Season 2, Sion Ogura
Prima Doll, Otome Okunomiya
Extreme Hearts, Sanae
I've Somehow Gotten Stronger When I Improved My Farm-Related Skills, Ruri
2023
Is It Wrong to Try to Pick Up Girls in a Dungeon? IV, Lyra
Nier: Automata Ver1.1a, YoRHa Type A No. 2 (A2)
2024
Highspeed Etoile, Yōran Ryū

Anime films
Yowamushi Pedal Re:RIDE (2014), Miki Kanzaki
The Anthem of the Heart (2015), Akemi Ishikawa
Yowamushi Pedal the Movie (2015), Miki Kanzaki
Kin-iro Mosaic Pretty Days (2016), Honoka Matsubara
Yowamushi Pedal: Spare Bike (2016), Miki Kanzaki
Trinity Seven the Movie: The Eternal Library and the Alchemist Girl (2017), Hijiri Kasuga
Trinity Seven: Heavens Library & Crimson Lord (2019), Hijiri Kasuga

Original video animation
Yowamushi Pedal Special Ride (2013), Miki Kanzaki
If Her Flag Breaks (2014), Ruri Ninjabayashi
 Nozo x Kimi (2014), Nozomi Komine
Riddle Story of Devil (2014), Tokaku Azuma
 Hozuki's Coolheadedness (2015), Miki
 Nozo x Kimi (2015), Nozomi Komine
Alice in Deadly School (2021), Kiriko Tōnuma

Web anime
Ninja Slayer From Animation (2015), Okayo - ep. 3
Kaiju Girls (2016), Gomora/Mikazuki Kuroda
Koro-sensei Q! (2016), Tōka Yada

Games
The Idolmaster Million Live! (2013), Matsuri Tokugawa
Nekomimi Survivor (2014), Fio
Granblue Fantasy (2014), Tanya
Fire Emblem Fates (2015), Elise
Nier: Automata (2017), YoRHa Type A No. 2 (A2)
Onmyōji (2017), Yuki-onna, Hotaru-gusa, Kyonshi-imouto, Kusa
Fire Emblem Heroes (2017), Elise, Karla
Girls' Frontline (2017), Negev
Azur Lane (2017), Arethusa
Yuki Yuna is a Hero: Hanayui no Kirameki (2017), Utano Shiratori
Dragalia Lost (2018), Alex
Arknights (2019), Cuora, Manticore, Gavial
King's Raid (2020), Xerah
TOUHOU Spell Bubble (2020), Reimu Hakurei
Onmyoji (2021), Semigoori Yuki-onna
Counter:Side (2021), Miya
Made in Abyss: Binary Star Falling into Darkness (2022), Tiare
Octopath Traveler: Champions of the Continent (2022), YoRHa Type A No. 2 (A2)

References

External links
 Official agency profile 
 

Japanese voice actresses
1988 births
Living people
People from Nisshin, Aichi
Voice actresses from Aichi Prefecture
21st-century Japanese actresses
Arts Vision voice actors
Aichi Shukutoku University alumni